The Technological University(Toungoo) is located on Toungoo, Bago Region, Myanmar. It was founded as  a Technical High School on 30 June 1982. It was known as Government Technical Institute and then changed to Government Technical College, and it was upgraded to the university Level in 2007.

Departments
Civil Engineering Department
Electronic Engineering Department
Electrical Power Engineering Department
Mechanical Engineering Department
Mechatronic Engineering Department
Information Technology Department
Myanmar Department
Engineering English Department
Engineering Mathematics Department
Engineering Physics Department
Engineering Chemistry Department

Programs

Technological University (Taungoo) offers the following degree programs. These are
Undergraduate Degree Program
Graduate Degree Program

References
https://web.archive.org/web/20111005202232/http://www.most.gov.mm/taungootu/index.php?option=com_frontpage&Itemid=1

Educational institutions established in 1982
Universities and colleges in Taungoo
Universities and colleges in Bago Region
Arts and Science universities in Myanmar
Technological universities in Myanmar
1982 establishments in Burma